is a mountain on the border between Chichibu, Saitama and Kawakami, Nagano in the Okuchichibu Mountains of Japan.

References

Sanpo
Sanpo